William Woodnut Griscom (1851–1897) was an American inventor responsible for introducing electric motors for the purpose of marine propulsion.  With some 40 patents to his name, Griscom also founded the Electro-Dynamic Company in 1880, based in Philadelphia. Much information in regards to Electro-Dynamic Company (and its origins) has not been made altogether clear.  In 1892, Isaac Rice bailed Electro-Dynamic out following a bankruptcy and became a co-owner. Two years after Griscom died in an 1897 hunting accident, his company was acquired by Rice's new Electric Boat Company. He was awarded the John Scott Medal of The Franklin Institute in 1882. He is buried at the Church of the Redeemer Cemetery in Bryn Mawr, Pennsylvania.

References

Sources 

 Electric Boat Corporation, James S. Reyburn
 General Dynamics Electric Boat Division official history site

1851 births
1897 deaths
19th-century American inventors
Hunting accident deaths